Metenolone enanthate, or methenolone enanthate, sold under the brand names Primobolan Depot and Nibal Injection, is an androgen and anabolic steroid (AAS) medication which is used mainly in the treatment of anemia due to bone marrow failure. It is given by injection into muscle. Although it was widely used in the past, the drug has mostly been discontinued and hence is now mostly only available on the black market.  A related drug, metenolone acetate, is taken by mouth.

Side effects of metenolone enanthate include symptoms of masculinization like acne, increased hair growth, voice changes, and increased sexual desire. The drug is a synthetic androgen and anabolic steroid and hence is an agonist of the androgen receptor (AR), the biological target of androgens like testosterone and dihydrotestosterone (DHT). It has moderate anabolic effects and weak androgenic effects, as well as no estrogenic effects or risk of liver damage. Metenolone enanthate is a metenolone ester and a long-lasting prodrug of metenolone in the body.

Metenolone enanthate was introduced for medical use in 1962. In addition to its medical use, metenolone enanthate is used to improve physique and performance. The drug is a controlled substance in many countries and so non-medical use is generally illicit. It remains marketed for medical use only in a few countries, such as Spain and Turkey.

Medical uses
Metenolone enanthate has been studied in the treatment of breast cancer.

Side effects

Pharmacology

Pharmacodynamics

As a derivative of DHT, metenolone, the active form of metenolone enanthate, is not aromatized, and so has no propensity for producing estrogenic side effects like gynecomastia. As an AAS, metenolone enanthate is antigonadotropic and can suppress the hypothalamic–pituitary–gonadal axis and produce reversible hypogonadism and infertility.

Pharmacokinetics
The biological half-life of metenolone enanthate is reported to be about 10.5 days by intramuscular injection.

Chemistry

Metenolone enanthate, or metenolone 17β-enanthate, is a synthetic androstane steroid and a derivative of DHT. It is the C17β enanthate (heptanoate) ester of metenolone, which itself is 1-methyl-δ1-4,5α-dihydrotestosterone (1-methyl-δ1-DHT) or 1-methyl-5α-androst-1-en-17β-ol-3-one.

History
Metenolone enanthate was introduced for medical use in 1962 in the United States under the brand name Nibal Depot. It was soon discontinued in the United States and was marketed instead in Europe in the 1960s and 1970s under the brand name Primobolan Depot.

Society and culture

Generic names

Brand names
Metenolone enanthate is or has been marketed under the brand names Nibal Injection and Primobolan Depot.

Availability
Metenolone enanthate is marketed in Spain and Turkey.

Doping in sports

There are known cases of doping in sports with metenolone enanthate by professional athletes.

References

External links
 Primobolan Depot (methenolone enanthate) - William Llewellyn's Anabolic.org 

Androgen esters
Androgens and anabolic steroids
Androstanes
Enanthate esters
Enones
Esters
Prodrugs